Kerstin Nilsson (born 1956) is a Swedish Social Democratic Party politician.

She was elected member of the Riksdag for the periods 2010–2014 and 2014–2018, from the Skåne Southern constituency.

References

1956 births
Living people
Women members of the Riksdag
Members of the Riksdag 2014–2018
21st-century Swedish women politicians
Members of the Riksdag from the Social Democrats